The family Nolidae is represented by six species in Great Britain:

 Meganola strigula, small black arches — south (Nationally Scarce A)
 Meganola albula, Kent black arches — south-east (Nationally Scarce B)
 Nola cucullatella, short-cloaked moth — south & central 
 Nola confusalis, least black arches — throughout (localized)
 Nola aerugula, scarce black arches — immigrant & transient resident (Kent, 1858–1898)
 Nola chlamytulalis, Jersey black arches — rare immigrant

See also
List of moths of Great Britain (overview)
Family lists: Hepialidae, Cossidae, Zygaenidae, Limacodidae, Sesiidae, Lasiocampidae, Saturniidae, Endromidae, Drepanidae, Thyatiridae, Geometridae, Sphingidae, Notodontidae, Thaumetopoeidae, Lymantriidae, Arctiidae, Ctenuchidae, Nolidae, Noctuidae and Micromoths

References 
 Waring, Paul, Martin Townsend and Richard Lewington (2003) Field Guide to the Moths of Great Britain and Ireland. British Wildlife Publishing, Hook, UK. .

Moths
Britain